Chris Kane may refer to:

 Chris Kane (footballer, born 1993), Scottish footballer (Heart of Midlothian, Dunfermline Athletic)
 Chris Kane (footballer, born 1994), Scottish footballer (St. Johnstone, Dumbarton, Queen of the South)
 Chris Kane (The Edge), The Edge character

See also
 Christian Kane (born 1974), American actor and singer
 Christopher Kane, fashion designer
 Christopher J. Kane, Irish Gaelic footballer
 Christopher Cain (disambiguation)